Agathe Génois (born 1952) is a Canadian writer living in Quebec.

She was born in Saint-Raymond. Although she has published two collections of poetry, she decided to concentrate on youth literature in 1995.

Selected works 
 Sarah, je suis là! (1996), youth novel, received the Prix Libellule, was a finalist for a Governor General's Literary Award and received the emerging talent award for the 
 Adieu, vieux lézard! (1998), youth novel, was a finalist for a Governor General's Literary Award
 À toi de jouer, Sarah ! (2000), youth novel, received a Canada Council grant

References 

1952 births
Living people
Canadian women poets
Canadian children's writers in French
Canadian poets in French
Canadian women children's writers
Canadian women novelists
Canadian novelists in French
Writers from Quebec